The Pylos Regional Archaeological Project (or PRAP) is a diachronic and multi-disciplinary archaeological expedition established in 1990. Its purpose is to study the history of prehistoric and historic settlement in southwestern Greece (modern Messenia). The focus of the expedition entails surveying the Bronze Age administrative center known as the Palace of Nestor. Its directors were Professors Jack L. Davis, John Bennet, Susan E. Alcock, Cynthia Shelmerdine, and Yannis Lolos.

References

1990 establishments in Greece
Archaeology of Greece
Archaeological projects
Archaeological expeditions
Messenia